Igor Ivanovich Bochkin   (born February 17, 1957) is a Soviet and Russian theater, television and film actor, theater director. He has appeared in more than 50 films since 1972. He was named a People's Artist of the Russian Federation in 2005.

Selected filmography
 1984 – Egorka as signalman
 1985 – Sincerely Yours... as museum guard
 1990 – Frenzied Bus as Pavel Melkoyants
 2001 – Yellow Dwarf as  Mikhail Semyonov
 2002 – Investigation Held by ZnaToKi as Kandelaki
 2003 – And in the Morning They Woke Up as Sasha
 2004 – Moscow Saga  as Petukhov

References

External links
 

1957 births
Male actors from Moscow
Living people
Soviet male film actors
Soviet male stage actors
Russian male film actors
Russian male stage actors
Honored Artists of the Russian Federation
People's Artists of Russia
Russian Academy of Theatre Arts alumni
Russian theatre directors
Soviet male television actors
Russian male television  actors
Recipients of the Medal of the Order "For Merit to the Fatherland" II class
Soviet male child actors